Half Acre may refer to:

Half Acre, Alabama
Half Acre, New Jersey
Half Acre Beer Company
"Half Acre", a song on the 2002 album Rabbit Songs by Hem.